Midtown station may refer to:

 Midtown station (MARTA)
 Midtown station (Oklahoma City Streetcar)